"Seventeen" is a song by Australian rock band Jet and is the third single taken from their third album Shaka Rock. The song has received heavy airplay throughout Australia and has gone on to become the second highest-charting single from Shaka Rock and their second top 40 ARIA Singles Chart hit from the album. The single initially entered the chart at #40 but managed to rise up to #31 in its 5th week. A music video has been filmed for the single.

Track listing

Chart positions

Awards and nominations

APRA Awards
The APRA Awards are presented annually from 1982 by the Australasian Performing Right Association (APRA).

|-
|rowspan="2"| 2011 || "Seventeen" – Nicholas Cester, Christopher Cester, Cameron Muncey || Most Played Australian Work || 
|-
| "Seventeen" – Nicholas Cester, Christopher Cester, Cameron Muncey  || Rock Work of the Year ||

References

Songs about teenagers
2009 songs
2010 singles
APRA Award winners
Atlantic Records singles
Jet (band) songs
Songs written by Cameron Muncey
Songs written by Chris Cester
Songs written by Nic Cester
Warner Music Australasia singles